Costel Fane Pantilimon (born 1 February 1987) is a former Romanian professional footballer who played as a goalkeeper, as well as the current general manager of Romanian side Politehnica Timișoara.

Pantilimon began his senior career at Politehnica Timișoara. In 2011, he signed for Manchester City on an initial loan, serving as a back-up to Joe Hart. Pantilimon was first choice for City in the 2013–14 League Cup, which they went on to win. He then stayed in the Premier League with Sunderland, spending one-and-a-half seasons there before a transfer to Watford in 2016.

Pantilimon was an international for Romania from 2008 to 2017, and was selected for UEFA Euro 2016.

Club career

Early career
Born in Bacău, Pantilimon started his career at Aerostar Bacău and got his share of limelight at the Romania national under-19 team before transferring to Politehnica Timișoara on 1 February 2006, his 19th birthday.

Politehnica Timișoara
Initially, Pantilimon was Timișoara's second-choice goalkeeper, behind Marius Popa. In May 2008, however, the owner of the club, Marian Iancu, transferred Popa to the second team, and Pantilimon took the pole position. He made his debut in the Romanian Liga 1 against Dinamo București, in March 2007.

In a match against Ceahlăul on 17 October 2009, Pantilimon captained the team for the first time, since Dan Alexa, Gigel Bucur and Arman Karamyan and his brother Artavazd were all on the bench.

Pantilimon was part of the Timișoara team that defeated UEFA Cup winners Shakhtar Donetsk in the qualifying rounds of the 2009–10 Champions League campaign. He played all 90 minutes of each leg.

Manchester City

On 11 August 2011, Pantilimon joined Manchester City on a one-year loan deal from Politehnica Timișoara to act as cover for Joe Hart following the departure of Shay Given.

Pantilimon's first start was a League Cup win against holders Birmingham City on 21 September 2011. His next match was on 26 October, against Wolverhampton Wanderers in the same competition, where City fielded a second-string team, although still comprehensively won 5–2. Pantilimon got his next Manchester City start during the 1–0 League Cup quarter-final win against Arsenal at the Emirates Stadium. In the Arsenal match, he was named Man of the Match, making two saves in the first half. He started the third round of the FA Cup against Manchester United at the City of Manchester Stadium on 8 January 2012, saving Wayne Rooney's penalty but was unable to save the follow up; Manchester City lost the game 3–2.

Pantilimon's loan deal was made permanent for an undisclosed fee. He was contracted to City until 2016. During the 2012–13 FA Cup, he kept four clean sheets in a row and managed an outstanding performance against Chelsea in the semi-final, conceding just one goal in five matches. In response to this performance, then City manager Roberto Mancini immediately promised that the Romanian would keep his place when the team return to Wembley Stadium to face Wigan Athletic on 11 May.
However, he was a substitute in the final, with Joe Hart starting; Manchester City lost to Wigan 1–0. It was later revealed that Mancini had promised on the eve of the FA Cup Final that the Romanian would play, but then deputed the goalkeeping coach on match day morning to say there had been a change of plan.

Pantilimon was given his first start of the 2013–14 season for City in the Football League Cup third-round match at home to Wigan on 24 September 2013, which City won 5–0; manager Manuel Pellegrini praised him for keeping a clean sheet. Five weeks later, Pantilimon was also selected to start in the next League Cup match away to Newcastle United on 30 October; once again, he conceded no goals, as City won 2–0 and progressed to the last eight of the competition. Three days later, he made his Premier League debut at home to Norwich City, keeping his third clean sheet in a row in an emphatic 7–0 victory. On 7 November 2013, he started in Champions League game against CSKA Moscow that ended in City winning 5–2. He started his second Premier League game on 10 November 2013 away against Sunderland that ended in a 0–1 defeat.

On 2 March 2014, Pantilimon started for Manchester City in the 2014 League Cup Final at Wembley Stadium. The team won 3–1 against Sunderland with goals from Yaya Touré, Samir Nasri and Jesús Navas.

Overall, Pantilimon made seven appearances during the 2013–14 Premier League season, keeping three clean sheets as Manchester City won a second league title in three years. He was also the team's first-choice goalkeeper for their League Cup and FA Cup matches.

Sunderland

On 16 June 2014, Pantilimon joined Sunderland on a free transfer from Manchester City. On 27 August, he made his first appearance for the club in the second round of the League Cup second round against Birmingham City, keeping a clean sheet in a 3–0 win at St Andrew's. Pantilimon started the season as back-up for Vito Mannone, but after poor performances in an 8–0 loss to Southampton and a 2–0 loss to Arsenal, the Italian was subsequently dropped and Pantilimon made his Premier League debut for Sunderland in a 3–1 win at Crystal Palace on 3 November 2014, thus becoming the club's first choice keeper for the rest of the season. He started the next season as first choice before losing his place to Mannone, eventually dropping to third choice behind Jordan Pickford.

Watford
On 19 January 2016, Pantilimon joined Premier League rivals Watford on a three-and-a-half-year deal, for an undisclosed fee. He made his first appearance for the Hornets on 30 January in their FA Cup Fourth Round victory at Nottingham Forest. He also started the game in the Fifth Round against Leeds United. He kept clean sheets in both games. He made his Premier League debut for the Hornets in a forgettable 6–1 defeat at Liverpool on 6 November 2016, after Heurelho Gomes was injured during the first half.

On 1 September 2017, Pantilimon joined La Liga club Deportivo La Coruña on a one-year loan from Watford, lasting until 20 May 2018. The long-term absence of first-choice keeper Rubén, who suffered a hand injury in training, prompted the signing. Pantilimon made his debut for the Galicians against Real Betis on 16 September. The following week, Pantilimon picked up his first clean sheet, coming in a 1–0 win over Alavés.

Nottingham Forest
On 31 January 2018, Pantilimon left Spain to return to England and sign on loan for EFL Championship side Nottingham Forest until the end of the 2017–18 season. He made his full début away at Fulham on 3 February. He made his home début against Hull City the following week, saving a penalty from Jon Toral. He made the English Football League's Team of the Week after producing a clean sheet at Burton Albion when Forest were reduced to ten men for much of the match on 17 February.

On 3 July 2018, Pantilimon signed a three-year deal with Forest.

On 30 January 2020, Pantilimon was loaned to Cypriot First Division side Omonia for the remainder of the season.

Denizlispor
On 4 September 2020, Pantilimon joined Turkish Süper Lig side Denizlispor following a mutual termination of his contract at Nottingham Forest.

International career

Pantilimon is a former Romania under-21 international. He made his debut for the senior Romania national team on 19 November 2008, in a friendly against Georgia. On 31 May 2016, Pantilimon was included in the final 23-man squad for UEFA Euro 2016, but did not appear in all matches in this tournament; Romanian coach Anghel Iordănescu used Ciprian Tătărușanu as the nation's first-choice.

Personal life
Pantilimon is a hearing child of two deaf parents. He married Andreea Berbece in 2013.

Career statistics

Club

International

Honours

Politehnica Timisoara
Liga I: runner-up 2008–09, 2010–11
Liga II: 2011–12
Cupa Romaniei: runner-up 2006–07, 2008–09 

Manchester City
Premier League: 2013–14
Football League Cup: 2013–14
FA Community Shield: 2012

Deportivo La Coruna
Teresa Herrera Trophy: 2017, runner-up 2018

Omonia Nikosia
Cypriot First Division: 2019–20

References

External links

 
 
 

1987 births
Living people
Sportspeople from Bacău
Romanian footballers
Romanian expatriate footballers
Romania youth international footballers
Romania under-21 international footballers
Romania international footballers
Association football goalkeepers
CS Aerostar Bacău players
FC Politehnica Timișoara players
Manchester City F.C. players
Sunderland A.F.C. players
Watford F.C. players
Deportivo de La Coruña players
Nottingham Forest F.C. players
AC Omonia players
Denizlispor footballers
Liga I players
Premier League players
La Liga players
Cypriot First Division players
Süper Lig players
Expatriate footballers in England
Expatriate footballers in Spain
Expatriate footballers in Cyprus
Expatriate footballers in Turkey
Romanian expatriate sportspeople in England
Romanian expatriate sportspeople in Spain
Romanian expatriate sportspeople in Cyprus
Romanian expatriate sportspeople in Turkey
UEFA Euro 2016 players